Lisa Curran is an American tropical forester, and Roger and Cynthia Lang Professor in Environment & Anthropology, at Stanford University.

Education 
Curran graduated from Harvard University, and Princeton University with a Ph.D.

Career 
Curran was professor of tropical ecology and director of the Tropical Resources Institute at the Yale University.

Curran is a professor at the Santa Fe Institute.

Awards
2006 MacArthur Fellows Program

Works
Carlson, K.* and L. M. Curran, 2009. "REDD pilot project scenarios: Are costs and benefits altered by spatial scale?", Environmental Research Letters.
Ponette-Gonzalez, A. G., K. C. Weathers and L. M. Curran, 2010. "Water inputs across a tropical montane landscape in Veracruz, Mexico: synergistic effects of land cover, rain and fog seasonality, and interannual precipitation variability", Global Change Biology, 16 (3): 946–963. 
Balch, J.K.,* D. C. Nepstad, and L. M. Curran, 2009. "Pattern and process: Fire-initiated grass invasion at Amazon transitional forest edges". In: Fire Ecology of Tropical Ecosystems, Ed M. Cochrane.
Balch, J.K.,* D. C. Nepstad, P. M. Brando, L. M. Curran, O. Portela, O. de Carvalho Jr., and P. Lefebvre, 2008. "Negative fire feedback in a transitional forest of southern Amazonia". Global Change Biology 14: 2276-2287.
Cannon, C. H.,* L. M. Curran, A. J. Marshall, and M. Leighton, 2007. "Long-term reproductive behavior of woody plants across seven Bornean forest types in the Gunung Palung National Park (Indonesia): supra-annual synchrony, temporal productivity and fruiting diversity". Ecology Letters 10:956-969.
Paoli, G. D.,* and L. M. Curran, 2007. "Soil nutrients limit aboveground productivity in mature lowland tropical forests of Southwestern Borneo". Ecosystems 10:503-518.
Gullison, R.E, P. Frumhoff, J. Canadell, C. B. Field, D.C. Nepstad, K. Hayhoe, R. Avissar, L.M. Curran, P. Friedlingsten, C.D. Jones and C. Nobre. 2007. "Tropical forests and climate policy". Science 316:985-986.
Curran, L.M. and S. D. Trigg. 2006. "Sustainability science from space: Quantifying forest disturbance and land use in the Amazon". Proc. of Nat. Acad. Sci. 103:12663-12664.
Soares-Filho, B., D. C. Nepstad, L. M. Curran et al., 2006. "Modelling conservation in the Amazon basin". Nature 440:520-523.
Santilli, M., P. M. Moutino, S. Schwartzman, D. C. Nepstad, L. M. Curran, and C. Nobre. 2005. "Tropical deforestation and the Kyoto Protocol". Climatic Change 71:267-276.
Soares-Filho, Britaldo Silveira, Nepstad, Daniel Curtis, Curran, Lisa et al. 2005. "Cenários de desmatamento para a Amazônia". Estudos Avançados 19:137-152.
Curran, L. M., S. Trigg, A. McDonald, D. Astiani, Y. M. Hardiono, P. Siregar, I. Caniago, and E. Kasischke. 2004. "Lowland forest loss in protected areas of Indonesian Borneo". Science 303:1000-1003. SOM
Barber, C. V., E. Mathews, D. Brown, T. H. Brown, L. M. Curran, C. Plume, and E. Selig. 2002. "The State of the Forest: Indonesia". Forest Watch International/ Global Forest Watch/World Resources Institute. 119 pp. Also published in Bahasa Indonesia, Keadaan Hutan Indonesia 131 pp.
Curran, L. M., I. Caniago, G. D. Paoli,* D. Astiani,* M. Kusneti, M. Leighton, C. E. Nirarita, and H. Haeruman. 1999. "Impact of El Niño and logging on canopy tree recruitment in Borneo". Science 286:2184-2188.

References

External links
"Lisa Curran Interview", odeo, Jun 23, 2008

Living people
Harvard University alumni
Princeton University alumni
Yale University faculty
Stanford University Department of Anthropology faculty
MacArthur Fellows
American foresters
Year of birth missing (living people)
Women in forestry
Santa Fe Institute people
Conservation biologists